Hangul Office is a proprietary word processing application published by the South Korean company Hancom Inc. Hangul's specialized support for the Korean written language has gained it widespread use in South Korea, especially by the government. Hancom has published their HWP binary format specification online for free.

The software's name is derived from the Korean word Hangul for the alphabet used to write Korean.

Haansoft near bankruptcy
Haansoft was on the verge of bankruptcy after the release of its 2002 version, due to the widespread use of illegal copies. A campaign to support the development of Korean software and promote the purchase of legal copies of Hangul allowed Haansoft to recover.

Versions
Previous versions have included:

Windows
 Hangul 3.0, 3.0a, 3.0b (1995)
 Hangul 96, International, Japanese (1996)
 Hangul 97, 97 strengthen, 815 special edition (1998)
 Hangul Wordian, Hangul for Kids (2000)
 Hangul 2002 (2001, widely used for government e-document system)
 Hangul 2004 (2003)
 Hangul 2005 (2004)
 Hangul 2007 (2006)
 Hangul 2010 (2010)
 Hancom Office 2010 SE(English Edition)
 Hangul 2014 (2013)
 Hangul NEO (2016)
 ThinkFree (2017)

macOS
 Hangul 2006 (2006) : PPC binary
 Hangul 2014 for Mac (2013)

Linux
 Hangul X R4 (1999, bundled in Mizi Linux 1 and 1.1)
 Hangul X R5 (2000, included in Hancom Office 2)
 Hangul 2008 Linux (2008, included in Hancom Office 2008 Linux)

References

External links
 
 

Communications in South Korea
Windows word processors
Linux word processors
MacOS word processors
1989 software